Natalie Raits (born 1 July 2002) is an Israeli group rhythmic gymnast.

Early life 
Raits was born in Israel. She began training in gymnastics at age 4.

Career
Her head coach is Ira Vigdorchik.

In 2016 Raits came in second in the all-around juniors competition at the International Rhythmic Gymnastics Tournament in Corbeil-Essonnes, France.

Raits competed at the 2018 World Championships, where team Israel finished in 15th in the group all-around. She competed at 2019 World Championships, where team Israel finished in sixth in the group all-around.

In 2019 Raits came in first place at the Rhythmic Gymnastics World Cup in Romania.

In 2021 Raits came in second at the Rhythmic Gymnastics World Cup in Uzbekistan.

Raits competed at the 2021 European Championships where she won a gold medal in the 3 hoops + 4 clubs and bronze medals in the 5 balls, group all-around and team competitions.

Raits represented Israel at the 2020 Summer Olympics, alongside Ofir Dayan, Yana Kramarenko, Yuliana Telegina and Karin Vexman. The team finished in sixth place.

Raits retired after the 2020 Summer Olympics.

Personal life 
Raits has said her sport role model is Usain Bolt. Her favorite singer is Hanan ben-Ari.

References

External links
 

2002 births
Living people
Israeli rhythmic gymnasts
Medalists at the Rhythmic Gymnastics European Championships
People from Eilat
Gymnasts at the 2020 Summer Olympics
Olympic gymnasts of Israel